Kiss is a very common Hungarian surname, derived from kis, meaning "small". The name was applied as a nickname for a person of small stature or the younger of two bearers of the same personal name.  It may refer to:

 Antal Kiss (1935–2021), Hungarian athlete
 August Kiss (1802–1865), German sculptor
 Balázs Kiss (athlete) (born 1972), Hungarian athlete
 Balázs Kiss (wrestler), Hungarian Greco-Roman wrestler
 Béla Kiss (1877–1916), Hungarian serial killer
 Cássia Kiss (born 1958), Brazilian actress
 Dániel Kiss (athlete) (born 1982), Hungarian athlete
 Edmund Kiss (1886 – 1960) German pseudo-archaeologist
 Elizabeth Kiss (born 1961), U.S. academic
 Gergely Kiss (born 1977), Hungarian water polo player
 Géza Kiss (1882–1952), Hungarian freestyle swimmer
 György Kiss (footballer) (born 1975), Hungarian football player
 István Kiss (disambiguation), multiple people
 John Z. Kiss (born 1960), American biologist
 László Kiss (footballer) (born 1956), Hungarian football coach
 Les Kiss (born 1964), Australian rugby league footballer of the 1980s and 1990s
 Manyi Kiss (1911–1971), Hungarian actress
 Nicky Kiss, British rugby league footballer of the 1970s and 1980s
 Péter Kiss (1959–2014), Hungarian politician
 Peter Kiss (basketball) (born 1997), American basketball player
 Robert S. Kiss (born 1957), U.S. politician
 Tamás Pál Kiss (born 1991), Hungarian racing driver
 Zoltán Kiss (born 1980), Hungarian football player

See also
 Kis (disambiguation)
 Kish (disambiguation)
 Péter Kiss (disambiguation)

References

Hungarian-language surnames

de:Kiss